Jean-Pierre Grand (born 18 November 1950) is a French politician. He served as the mayor of Castelnau-Le-Lez from 1977 to 2017 and as deputy in the French National Assembly from 2002 to 2012.

Jean-Pierre Grand was elected Deputy on 16 June 2002, for the 12th legislature (2002–2007), in the 3rd circonscription of Hérault. He was re-elected on 17 June 2007 for another 5 years. He is a member of French's leading right-wing party, the Union for a Popular Movement (UMP).

He is a former assistant to famed French politician Jacques Chaban-Delmas, who served as his political mentor. As of 2006, Grand is faithful to the political family of Jacques Chirac, the President of France, notably former Prime Minister Alain Juppé and Dominique de Villepin and minister Michèle Alliot-Marie.

Grand openly supported De Villepin as a potential candidate for the 2007 French presidential election, against controversial candidate, former president of UMP, ultimately elected President, Nicolas Sarkozy. Dominique de Villepin personally visited, as Prime Minister, Jean-Pierre Grand's city, Castelnau-Le-Lez, on 8 December 2006. https://soundcloud.com/yflamkcpbdglbblckjck/

Sources and external links
 Grand's bio on the official National Assembly website
 Bio in reputable French newspaper Les Echos
 Jean-Pierre Grand's Blog

1950 births
Living people
Politicians from Montpellier
Rally for the Republic politicians
Union for a Popular Movement politicians
United Republic politicians
The Republicans (France) politicians
French Senators of the Fifth Republic
Mayors of places in Occitania (administrative region)
Deputies of the 12th National Assembly of the French Fifth Republic
Deputies of the 13th National Assembly of the French Fifth Republic
Senators of Hérault
Members of Parliament for Hérault